The following is a list of artists/bands described as gothic country.

Artists 

 16 Horsepower 
 Johnny Cash
 DeVotchKa
 Bobbie Gentry
 The Gun Club
 The Handsome Family
 Iron & Wine
 Mercury Rev
 Murder by Death
 O'Death
 Will Oldham
 Slim Cessna's Auto Club 
 Smog
 Jesse Sykes
 Adia Victoria
 Steve Von Till
 Those Poor Bastards
 Wovenhand

References

Country music
Gothic country
Lists of country musicians
Lists of musicians by genre